79360 Sila–Nunam, provisional designation , is a cold classical Kuiper belt object (cubewano) and binary system made up of components of almost equal size, called Sila and Nunam, orbiting beyond Neptune in the Solar System. The name of the system is the combined names of the two bodies, Sila and Nunam.

Discovery
Sila–Nunam was discovered on 4 February 1997 by Jane X. Luu, David C. Jewitt, Chad Trujillo, and Jun Chen at the Mauna Kea Observatory, Hawaii, and given the provisional designation . It was resolved as a binary system in Hubble observations of 22 October 2002 by Denise C. Stephens and Keith S. Noll and announced on 5 October 2005.

Name
The two components are named after Inuit deities. Sila "air" (Iñupiaq siḷa , Inuktitut sila) is the Inuit god of the sky, weather, and life force. Nuna "earth" (Iñupiaq amn Inuktitut nuna-m ) is the Earth goddess, in some traditions Sila's wife. Nuna created the land animals and, in some traditions, the Inuit (in other traditions Sila created the first people out of wet sand). Sila breathed life into the Inuit.

Orbit
Sila–Nunam is a dynamically cold classical system (cubewano). It orbits very close to 4:7 mean-motion resonance with Neptune.

Physical characteristics
In 2010, thermal flux from Sila–Nunam in the far-infrared was measured by the Herschel Space Telescope. As a result, its size, while it was assumed to be a single body, was estimated to lie within the range . Now that it is known to be a binary system, one body 95% the size of the other, the diameters are estimated to be .

Sila–Nunam is very red in visible light and has a flat featureless spectrum in the near-infrared. There are no water ice absorption bands in its near-infrared spectrum, which resembles that of Ixion.

Sila–Nunam experiences periodic changes in brightness with the full period, which is equal to the orbital binary period (see below). The light curve is double peaked with the secondary period equal to the half of the full period. The rotation of both components of the system is synchronously locked with the orbital motion and both bodies are elongated with their long axes pointing to each other. From 2009 to 2017 Sila–Nunam experienced mutual occultation events.

Double system 
Sila and Nunam are so close in size (within 5%) that they may be thought of as a double cubewano. Sila is approximately 250 km in diameter and Nunam 236 km. Their albedo is about 9%. They orbit at a distance of  every 12.51 days:

{| class="wikitable"
|-
|Semi-major axis: ||2,777 ± 19 km
|-
|Orbital period:||12.50995 ± 0.00036 d
|-
|Eccentricity:||0.020 ± 0.015°
|-
|Inclination:||103.51 ± 0.39°
|}

Each has apparently been resurfaced with ejecta from impacts on the other.

References

External links 
 
 

079360
Discoveries by Chad Trujillo
Discoveries by Jun Chen (astronomer)
Discoveries by Jane Luu
Discoveries by David C. Jewitt
Named minor planets
Binary trans-Neptunian objects
079360
19970203